The Apollo class were second-class protected cruisers designed by Sir William White and built for the Royal Navy in the late 19th century. Twenty-one ships of this class were built, making it the largest single class of steel cruisers ever built for the Royal Navy to the same design.

Design and construction
The design followed White's standard pattern for smaller steel cruisers, being of protected type (with an internal curved steel armour deck protecting the machinery spaces) and featuring low freeboard amidships with raised bulwarks connecting the forecastle and poop for weatherliness. It drew heavily from the slightly earlier Medea, but with enlarged dimensions and a revised armament which, for the first time in Royal Navy 2nd-class cruisers, included the new 4.7-inch quick-firing gun. Six of these were carried; three on each side of the main deck. Two 6-inch guns were carried on the centreline, one at either end of the ship upon the forecastle and the poop.

Ten ships of the class were sheathed and coppered for tropical service. These were; Aeolus, Brilliant, Indefatigable, Intrepid, Iphigenia, Pique, Rainbow, Retribution, Sirius and Spartan. The sheathing added 200 tons to each ship's displacement and reduced their speed by a quarter of a knot.

Critical opinion of the design was that it was an improvement on the Medea, but still rather small. In practice they proved to be wet ships and poor seaboats, the low deck amidships being a factor.

Twenty-one ships of this class were ordered under the 1889 Naval Defence Act, making up half of the Act's required forty-two cruisers. The obvious limitations of the Apollos led to a further enlarged & improved design (the ) being drawn up by White, of which eight units were also ordered under the Naval Defence Act.

Service
Ships of this class served during the Boer War.

Sybille was wrecked 16th January 1901.

Latona, Apollo, Intrepid, Iphigenia, Andromache, Naiad and Thetis were converted into minelaying cruisers around 1907.

In 1910 Rainbow was transferred to the Royal Canadian Navy.
In the same year, Indefatigable was renamed Melpomene to make her original name available for a new battle-cruiser.

After nearly two decades of service, the ships were becoming worn out and units of the class were being progressively sold off in the early 1910s; Melampus in 1910,Pique, Retribution and Tribune in 1911, Melpomene in 1913, and Aeolus, Scylla & Terpsichore in 1914.
The remainder found a reprieve with the outbreak of the First World War.

By the last year of the First World War, the surviving ships were no longer of any fighting value, and six of this class were converted into blockships to be scuttled in the entrances to enemy-occupied ports in Belgium. The cruisers Intrepid, Iphigenia and Thetis were expended on 23 April 1918 in the raid on Zeebrugge; Brilliant and Sirius were unsuccessfully expended in the similar raid on Ostend.

Spartan was renamed Defiance in 1921.

The surviving members of the class were for disposal after the war, mostly being sold between 1920 and 1922, with only Defiance being retained (as part of the torpedo school at Devonport) until finally sold in 1931.

Ships

Notes

Publications

External links

World War 1 Naval Combat
History of War

 

 
Cruiser classes
Ship classes of the Royal Navy